Wilhelm Haverkamp (4 March 1864, Senden - 13 January 1929, Berlin) was a German sculptor and medallist, in the Historicist style.

Life and work

From 1866, at the age of two, until 1877, he was raised by his mother's parents in Nordkirchen and attended elementary school there. With the help of a scholarship, won in a competition, he was able to attend the Prussian Academy of Arts, where he studied with Albert Wolff until 1885, then with Fritz Schaper. 

After completing his studies in 1887, he remained with Schaper as an assistant for two years, then went to Paris. That same year, he applied for the Prussian Academy's "Rome Prize" (modelled after the French Prix de Rome), which he received in 1890. While in Rome, he stayed at the Villa Strohl-Fern, where he was mentored by Robert Cauer. He also did some work at the Basilica of St. Augustine.

When he returned from Rome in 1892, he married Margarethe Ferlmann of Senden, the adopted daughter of one of his uncles who had emigrated to the United States. In 1899, he was awarded the Order of Albert the Bear. Two years later, he was presented with a small gold medal at the Große Berliner Kunstausstellung and named a Knight in the Order of the Red Eagle. 

He was named a Professor at the Museum in 1903, succeeding Ludwig Manzel, who had been promoted. In 1909, he was awarded another gold medal at the Große Münchener Kunstausstellung, and received a second one in Berlin in 1913. That same year, he was named a member of the Prussian State Art Commission. In 1916, he became a full member of the Prussian Academy. He retired from all of his positions in 1924.

References

Further reading 
 "Dr. Johannes Tschiedel über Wilhelm Haverkamp", Westermanns Monatshefte, #67, Vol.133, part I, November 1922, pp.231–243
 "Professor Wilhelm Haverkamp. Dem Gedächtnis des Berliner Bildhauers", Westfälische Nachrichten, Münster, 17 March 1950
 Rüdiger Bausch: Wilhelm Haverkamp – Lebenslauf und sein künstlerisches Schaffen, self-published, Senden 2013.

External links 

 Biography by Rüdiger Bausch @ Heimatverein Senden

1864 births
1929 deaths
German sculptors
People from Neu-Ulm (district)
Prussian Academy of Arts alumni